Denis Sergeyevich Kokarev (born June 17, 1985) is a Russian professional ice hockey player who is currently playing for Dynamo MO of the Supreme Hockey League (VHL).

Playing career
After 7 seasons within the rebranded HC Dynamo Moscow from his tenure with HC MVD, Kokarev while still contracted was granted free agent status from the KHL following the 2016–17 season, due to the club's debt on July 4, 2017. With Dynamo unwilling to offer an improved contract, Kokarev left to sign a two-year contract with Salavat Yulaev Ufa the following day on July 5, 2017.

Career statistics

International

References

External links

1985 births
Living people
HC Dynamo Moscow players
Metallurg Magnitogorsk players
HC MVD players
Sportspeople from Tver
Russian ice hockey forwards
Salavat Yulaev Ufa players
HC Spartak Moscow players
HC Vityaz players